is a Japanese actor who appears on stage and screen. He debuted as an actor in 1999 and has appeared in the "Bayside Shakedown" series, NHK's Gochisosan, and Yūsha Yoshihiko.

Filmography

Film
 Hentai Kamen (2013)
 Jossy's (2014)
 Himeanole (2016)
 Gold Medal Man (2016)
 Shippu Rondo (2016)
 Hentai Kamen: Abnormal Crisis (2016)
 Gin Tama (2017), Gengai Hiraga
 The Disastrous Life of Saiki K. (2017), Uryoku Chōno
 Destiny: The Tale of Kamakura (2017)
 Recall (2018), Shigemichi Komaki
 50 First Kisses (2018)
 Gin Tama 2 (2018), Gengai Hiraga
 Dance with Me (2019), Yoshio Watanabe
 The Bucket List (2019)
 NiNoKuni (2019), old man (voice)
 Wotakoi: Love Is Hard for Otaku (2020)
 From Today, It's My Turn!! (2020)
 State of Emergency (2020)
 The Untold Tale of the Three Kingdoms (2020), Zhuge Liang
 My Daddy (2021), Kazuo Midō
 Riverside Mukolitta (2022), Shimada
 Kami wa Mikaeri wo Motomeru (2022)

Television
 Aoi Honō (2014)
 Montage (2016), Daisuke Mizuhara
 Kidnap Tour (2016)
 Naotora: The Lady Warlord (2017), Seto Hōkyū
 Hello, Detective Hedgehog (2017)
 Don't Forget Me (2018)
 From Today, It's My Turn!! (2018)
 Two Homelands (2019)
 Daddy is My Classmate (2020), Tarō "Gatarō" Obika
 The Sunflower Disappeared in the Rain (2022), Ken'ichi Nara
 What Will You Do, Ieyasu? (2023), Toyotomi Hideyoshi

Dubbing roles

Animation
 Original voice: Alec Baldwin
 The Boss Baby - Theodore Lindsey "Ted" Templeton Jr./The Boss Baby
 The Boss Baby: Family Business - Theodore Lindsey "Ted" Templeton Jr./The Boss Baby

Awards

References

External links
 Tsuyoshi Muro Official Website 
 

1976 births
Living people
People from Kanagawa Prefecture
21st-century Japanese male actors